Carlisle High School is a public high school located in Carlisle, Pennsylvania, United States. It serves grades 9–12 for the Carlisle Area School District.

Demographics
The demographic breakdown of the 1,526 students enrolled for 2018-19 was:
Male - 50.7%
Female - 49.3%
Native American/Alaskan - 0.2%
Asian - 1.7%
Black - 7.6%
Hispanic - 7.7%
White - 75.6%
Multiracial - 7.2%

27.7% of the students were eligible for free or reduced-cost lunch. For 2018-19, Carlisle was a Title I school.

Notable alumni

Deborah L. Birx, physician and ambassador
Sid Bream, Major League Baseball (MLB) first baseman
Stephen D. Houston, Dupee Family Professor of Social Science at Brown University
Merkel Landis, banker and lawyer
Bob Lilley, professional soccer coach
Billy Owens, National Basketball Association (NBA) guard 
Lee Woodall (class of 1988), National Football League (NFL) linebacker

References

External links

Carlisle, Pennsylvania
Educational institutions in the United States with year of establishment missing
Public high schools in Pennsylvania
Schools in Cumberland County, Pennsylvania